George Albert Davies (19 January 1897 – 1956) was an English professional footballer who played as a wing half.

References

1897 births
1956 deaths
Sportspeople from Prescot
English footballers
Association football wing halves
Prescot Cables F.C. players
Hull City A.F.C. players
Merthyr Town F.C. players
Grimsby Town F.C. players
Whiston F.C. players
Llandudno F.C. players
Caernarvon Athletic F.C. players
Ashton National F.C. players
Northwich Victoria F.C. players
English Football League players